Podocinidae is a family of mites in the order Mesostigmata.

Genera
 Aceoseius Sellnick, 1941
 Aceoseius muricatus (C. L. Koch, 1839)
 Andregamasus Costa, 1965
 Andregamasus conchylicola (André, 1937)
 Derrickia Womersley, 1956
 Derrickia setosa Womersley, 1956
 Episeiella Willmann, 1938
 Episeiella heteropoda Willmann, 1938
 Podocinella Evans & Hyatt, 1958
 Podocinella meghalayaensis Bhattacharyya, 1994
 Podocinella plumosa Evans & Hyatt, 1958
 Podocinum Berlese, 1882
 Podocinum changchunense Liang, 1993
 Podocinum hainanense Liang, 1993
 Podocinum jianfenlingense Liang, 1993
 Podocinum monolicum Halliday, 1990
 Podocinum pacificum Berlese, 1895
 Podocinum protonotum Ishikawa & Saichuae, 1997
 Podocinum sagax (Berlese, 1882)
 Podocinum sibiricum Volonikhina, 1999
 Podocinum stellatum Ma-Liming & Wang-Shenron, 1998
 Podocinum taylori Halliday, 1990
 Podocinum tianmuense Liang, 1993

References

Mesostigmata
Acari families